Grow Fins: Rarities 1965–1982 is a 5-HDCD box set compiled from previously unreleased recordings by Captain Beefheart & the Magic Band.  The featured material spans the band's entire career, but focuses mainly on their work up to the late 1960s and the sessions for Beefheart's best-known album, Trout Mask Replica (1969).

Track listing

Notes

External links
 Grow Fins at the Captain Beefheart Radar Station

Captain Beefheart albums
1999 compilation albums
Revenant Records compilation albums